World Chase Tag is an international championship for competitive parkour involving the game of tag. Events have been televised on NBSCN in the United States and on Channel 4 and BBC Three in the United Kingdom. Events have also attracted millions of views online. 

World Chase Tag was founded by Christian Devaux in 2012, with his brother Damien joining the organisation the following year. The inspiration for the sport came after a game of tag between Christian and his child.

Rules 
Matches are played between two teams of up to six players over a series of 16 rounds. Each round is contested between one member of each team, with one player as the chaser and their opponent as the evader.

Players begin the round at opposite sides of a 12m × 12m square known as "The Quad", which is filled with various obstacles that players move over, under and through using parkour skills. The chaser has 20 seconds to tag the evader with their hand. If either player steps foot outside of The Quad they forfeit the round.

Points can only be scored by the evading team. A successful tag results in that player becoming the evader for the next round and no points being awarded. A successful evasion results in that player's team scoring a point, and the evader retaining that role for the next round. The losing player is replaced by a teammate who chases. Rounds are separated by 25 second rest breaks.

The team with the most points after 16 rounds wins. Ties result in a "sudden-death chase-off", which consists of a pair of rounds with each team chasing in one and evading in the other. The team with the longest evasion time wins. If this results in a further tie (i.e. both teams successfully evade for 20 seconds) the process is repeated.

Major events

See also 

Obstacle course racing
 Ultimate Tag
 Ultimate Kho Kho

References

External links
 

Parkour
Tag variants
Obstacle racing
Games and sports introduced in 2012